Kids Station (Japanese: キッズステーション, Kizzu Sutēshon) is a Japanese children's television channel showing anime and other cartoon material. Kids Station also airs some anime aimed at teens and adults during the night, such as Narutaru, Magical Shopping Arcade Abenobashi, Mr. Osomatsu, Genshiken, Naruto, Naruto: Shippuden, Kujibiki Unbalance, and Rosario + Vampire. It is broadcast 24 hours a day on cable and satellite TV.

Background history
It launched on April 1, 1993.

In 2017, Sony Pictures Entertainment Japan announced that a joint venture between itself and Mitsui & Co. known as AK Holdings would acquire their respective stakes in Animax and Kids Station. Sony holds a majority stake in the company.

Kids Station HD 
Kids Station HD (Japanese: キッズステーションHD, Kizzu Sutēshon HD), an HD version of this channel, was first established on October 1, 2009.
This channel usually broadcasts shows later than other television networks, when most of these shows have already finished broadcasting on other channels. Many of the series they broadcast are from the parents' generations, allowing a wider audience to view shows.

See also
Nickelodeon
Cartoon Network
Disney Channel

Ownership 
 Sony Pictures Entertainment Japan - 67%
 Tokyo Broadcasting System - 16%
 Jupiter Telecommunications - 15%
 Horipro - 2%

References

External links 
 Kids Station home page 

1993 establishments in Japan
Television channels and stations established in 1993
2017 mergers and acquisitions
Children's television channels in Japan
Anime television
Kids Station Inc.
Kids Station Inc.
Joint ventures
Classic television networks  
Children's television networks
Preschool education television networks
Sony subsidiaries
Sony Pictures Entertainment
Sony Pictures Television